Sprintermästaren (literally: "The Sprint Champion") is an annual international Group One harness event for trotters. It is held at Halmstad Racetrack in Halmstad, Sweden, and is a stakes race for 4-year-olds. The purse in the 2011 final was ≈US$288,000 (€200,000), of which the winner Orecchietti won half. The event is sometimes referred to as "Sweden's Hambletonian".

Racing conditions
From the beginning, Sprintermästaren was open only for Swedish four-year-old trotters. In 2002, the conditions were changed and the event has since then been open for foreign four-year-olds as well. The distance, one mile, has been the same since the beginning of the event in 1971. The final of the event is preceded by a number of elimination races, taking place the same day. Since 1995, the number of elimination heats has been three per year.

Past winners

Drivers with most wins
 5 - Stig H. Johansson
 5 - Örjan Kihlström
 2 - Erik Adielsson
 2 - Stefan Melander
 2 - Robert Bergh
 2 - Johnny Takter

Trainers with most wins
 6 - Stig H. Johansson
 4 - Stefan Melander
 3 - Stefan Hultman 
 3 - Robert Bergh
 2 - Sören Nordin

Sires with at least two winning offsprings
 3 - Andover Hall (Brad de Veluwe, Nuncio, Perfect Spirit)
 2 - Count's Pride (Alex Pride, Gaston Pride)
 2 - Speedy Somolli (Mr Lavec, Regent Broline)
 2 - Super Arnie (Beijing Boy, Dust All Over)
 2 - Super Bowl (Active Bowler, Ultimo H.)
 2 - Tibur (Callit, Drottning Sund)

Winning stallions that have also sired winners
 Mr Lavec (1995), sire of First Lavec (2001)

Winner with lowest odds
 Winning odds: 1.24 - Charme Asserdal (1977)

Winner with highest odds
 Winning odds: 42.55 - Beijing Boy (1999)

Fastest winner (finals only)
 1:09.3 (km rate) - Uncle Lasse (2016)

All winners of Sprintermästaren

See also
 List of Scandinavian harness horse races

References

Harness races in Sweden